Greenidge Elliott (21 October 1861 – 8 December 1895) was a Barbadian cricketer. He played in one first-class match for the Barbados cricket team in 1883/84.

See also
 List of Barbadian representative cricketers

References

External links
 

1861 births
1895 deaths
Barbadian cricketers
Barbados cricketers
People from Saint Michael, Barbados